Paul Y. Engineering is a Hong Kong construction and civil engineering company.

History
The company was founded by Paul Yung Tso (1904 – 1978), after whom the company was named, in Shanghai in 1946. It moved to Hong Kong in 1949 due to the Chinese Communist Revolution. It was incorporated in Hong Kong as a private limited company on 27 May 1960.

A Singapore office was established in 1953. The company built the Merdeka Bridge, opened 1956.

In 1970, Paul Y. went public on the Hong Kong Stock Exchange.

Paul Y. Holdings was acquired by International Tak Cheung Holdings in 1991. The name of the company was changed to Paul Y. – ITC Construction. The name of the company was changed to Paul Y. Engineering Group in 2005.

In 2011, Paul Y. Incorporated in Singapore as Paul Y. Construction & Engineering Pte. Ltd, and started embarking on Condominium and Hotel Building Projects.

Notable projects
 Merdeka Bridge, Singapore (1956)
 Former Chartered Bank Headquarters, Central, Hong Kong (1959)
 Lai Chi Kok Bridge, Lai Chi Kok, Hong Kong (1968)
 Cross-Harbour Tunnel, Hong Kong (1972)
 Kai Tak Airport runway extension (1974)
 Central–Mid-Levels escalator, Central, Hong Kong (1993)
 Ting Kau Bridge, New Territories, Hong Kong (1998)
 Cheung Kong Centre, Central, Hong Kong (1999) – with Downer Group

References

External links
 

1946 establishments in China
Construction and civil engineering companies of Hong Kong